Perryville, Texas is the name of two small communities in Texas:

Perryville, Bastrop County, Texas, a small community formerly located 2½ miles south of the site of present-day Elgin in Bastrop County
Perryville, Wood County, Texas, at the intersection of Farm to Market Roads 2088 and 852, eight miles southeast of Winnsboro in northeastern Wood County